Tunnel Avenue may be:

 New Jersey Route 139, United States
 A102 road south of Blackwall Tunnel, Greenwich, east London, England
 A street in San Francisco, California, United States
 A street in Greenwich, London, United Kingdom